Lucidio Sentimenti (1 July 1920 – 28 November 2014), also known as Sentimenti IV, was an Italian footballer from Bomporto in the Province of Modena, who played as a goalkeeper. His nickname, Sentimenti IV, comes from the fact that he is the fourth of five brothers – Ennio (I), Arnaldo (II), Vittorio (III) and Primo (V) - all of whom but the eldest were also professional footballers. Only Lucidio played for the Italy national side.

Club career
After starting his career with Modena, Sentimenti played football for several other Italian clubs, including Juventus and Lazio.

International career
Sentimenti also played for the Italy national football team nine different times between 1945 and 1964 and was a member of the team that took part at the 1950 FIFA World Cup.

Style of play
A former out-field player, who was capable of playing in any position, including as a striker, due to his excellent shot, Sentimenti was known for being an accurate penalty-kick taker, and very adept with the ball at his feet, possessing a long goal kick and accurate distribution, and was known to be one of the first goalscoring goalkeepers. Nicknamed "Cochi", he was a reliable, tenacious and composed goalkeeper, who was known for his intelligence and speed when rushing off his line to anticipate his opponents with his feet, as well as his ability to come out and collect crosses or punch the ball clear, despite his small stature, due to his athleticism, command of his area, and strong physique. An excellent shot-stopper between the posts, he was also known for his agility, handling, consistency, composure, and positional sense, although at times he was caught out from distance throughout his career.

Personal life
The Sentimenti family were prominent in Italian football, several of Lucidio's relatives in the game include his brothers; Ennio, Arnaldo, Vittorio and Primo, his cousins Lino and nephews Roberto and Andrea Sentimenti.

Lucidio played for Modena, Juventus and Lazio during the same time as his attacking midfielder brother Vittorio Sentimenti, both as prominent squad members. Primo played with them both at Lazio for a while.

Death
Sentimenti died in Turin, Italy, aged 94.

Honours
Vicenza
Serie B: 1954–55

References

External links
FIGC Profile 

1920 births
2014 deaths
Sportspeople from the Province of Modena
Italian footballers
Italy international footballers
1950 FIFA World Cup players
Association football goalkeepers
Juventus F.C. players
S.S. Lazio players
L.R. Vicenza players
Modena F.C. players
Torino F.C. players
Serie A players
Serie B players
Footballers from Emilia-Romagna